Jørund Telnes (10 January 1845 – 3 February 1892) was a Norwegian farmer, teacher, writer and politician. Today he is most commonly associated with his book Soga om Sterke-Nils about :no:Sterke-Nils (1722–1800), the legendary strongman from Telemark.

Telnes was born at Seljord in Telemark, Norway. He was the son of Nils Sigurdsson Forberg (1815–1874) and Ingebjørg Jørgensdotter Telnes (1825–1916).
He was educated at the seminary in Kviteseid and later founded a folk high school. In 1874 he took over the Telnes farm (Telnes i Seljord herad). He served as mayor of Seljord from 1878 to 1884.

From a young age Telnes wrote poems. He debuted his published writing in 1877. Among his literary works was the poetry collection Kvæe from 1878 and the song collection Guro Heddelid which was based on a 14th-century myth.

Selected works
Soga om Sterke-Nils    (1877)
Kvæe    (1878)
Rupe-Ber  (1878)
Guro Heddelid (1880)
Vetle Venehaug (1887)
Netar    (1890)

References

1845 births
1892 deaths
People from Seljord
19th-century Norwegian poets
Norwegian male poets
Mayors of places in Telemark

Heads of schools in Norway
19th-century Norwegian male writers